Katheyondu Shuruvagide (transl. A Story has blossomed) is a 2018 Indian Kannada-language romantic drama film directed by Senna Hegde and starring Diganth and Pooja Devariya (in her Kannada debut).

Plot
Tarun runs a resort on the coastal part of Karnataka, which has a small staff consisting of receptionist Swarna, attendant Pedro, and cook Kutty.

This beautiful resort is on the verge of closure for lack of guests and because of some fake negative reviews.

The staff prepares for the arrive of a couple, Tanya Mehra and Akash Mehra. Tarun goes to the airport to receive the guests but sees only Tanya.  While travelling to the resort, Tarun asks Tanya about her husband, and she says he has died. Tanya tells Tarun to keep it secret.

Pedro has a feelings for receptionist Swarna, but Swarna's marriage is being fixed with a man working in Dubai. 

Tarun is being guided by an elderly couple, Shashank Murthy and Radha Murthy. This couple has a special loving bond between them, which causes Tarun and Pedro to think to have a life partner. 

Following Tanya's stay in the resort and outdoor activities, Tanya and Tarun come close to each other. Meanwhile Pedro express his thoughts to Swarna, and she consoles Pedro and disagrees with his statement that a relationship is about more than love.

The next day, Tanya's husband arrives in the resort.  Tanya gets angry over him and leaves the resort for her city.  Tarun goes to the airport to find her and she hugs him from behind.

Cast 
Diganth as Tarun Manchale
Pooja Devariya as Tanya Mehra
Ashwin Rao Pallaki as Pedro
Shreya Anchan as Swarna
Babu Hirannaiah as Murthy
Aruna Balraj as Radha

Release 
The Times of India gave the film a rating of four out of five stars and noted that "Those looking at a getaway for three hours in a cinema hall for some laughs, a little tears and a story that is soulful and satisfying, this is definitely recommended". Deccan Herald, on the contrary, gave the film a rating of three out of five stars and stated that "We are offered a Hollywood-ish upgrade of the romantic film, with some bows in the direction of the Hindi film Queen. The romantic bits are, quite frankly, sahasra-yawny despite their being carefully underplayed and adroitly avoiding Nicholas Shakespeare territory." Baradwaj Rangan of Film Companion South wrote "The beats are generic, but the lovely cast and the freshness of the filmmaking, I think, could make Katheyondu Shuruvagide the Pelli Choopulu of Kannada cinema...there’s not one ill-considered frame (the cinematography is by Sreeraj Raveendran), and the aesthetics add to the experience, which holds you in the mood of a folk song hummed around a campfire."

References

External links 

2018 films
Indian romantic drama films
2018 romantic drama films